Public Radio Service (PRS) is a walkie-talkie personal radio service in the People's Republic of China, including Hong Kong and Macau, but excluding Taiwan. It can be used without a license. It uses 409 MHz. It is also known as PRS409.
It is similar to the American Family Radio Service (FRS) and PMR446 in the European Union.

Technical information
The PRS radios use narrow-band frequency modulation (NBFM) with a maximum deviation of 2.5 kHz. The channels are spaced at 12.5 kHz intervals. They are limited to 500 milliwatts effective radiated power.

See also
 70-centimeter band
 CDCSS
 Continuous Tone-Coded Squelch System (CTCSS)
 General Mobile Radio Service
 KDR 444 
 LPD433
 Multi-Use Radio Service
 Personal radio service
 Personal radio service#Taiwan
 UHF CB

Notes

References

Bandplans
Radio hobbies
Radio regulations
Radio technology